Antonio Veretti (Verona, February 20, 1900 - Rome, July 13, 1978) was an Italian composer.

Biography 
He studied at the Conservatory Giovanni Battista Martini in Bologna, where he was a pupil of Franco Alfano, and graduated in composition in 1921. Friend of Riccardo Bacchelli, who was also the author of some librettos of his works, attended the literary environment that gravitated around the magazine La Ronda.

Veretti began composing in Milan in 1926, when he was music critic for La fiera letteraria and, at the same time, an active popularizer of contemporary music in Italy. In Rome he founded the Conservatorio Musicale della Gioventù Italiana, where he taught until 1943. Later he was director of the Conservatory of Pesaro (1950-1952), Cagliari (1953-1955) and finally of the Conservatory Luigi Cherubini in Florence in the period 1956–1970. He was a member of the Accademia di S. Cecilia and of the Accademia Filarmonica in Rome, of the Accademia Filarmonica in Bologna and president of the Accademia Luigi Cherubini in Florence. He also wrote film music.

His music represented for a long time the avant-garde of the Italian production, both from the stylistic point of view (with the overcoming of verismo and the rediscovery of pre-nineteenth-century repertories) and methodological (with the progressive acceptance of the novelties of the Second Vienna School, up to the definitive acceptance of dodecaphony and post-Webernian serialism) and formal (in the musical theater he refused the traditional numbers introducing forms of instrumental music, on examples that started from the results of Alban Berg).

Sources

Autographs 
The autographs of almost all of Veretti's compositions are preserved in the Ricordi Archives in Milan.

Fondo Veretti 
The sketches of all his works (even the unfinished ones) are in the Fondo Veretti of the Scuola di Musica in Fiesole. The fund was donated by his wife Ines to Veretti's friend and colleague Piero Farulli as early as 1978, with a final donation in 2005 At first kept in many rooms of Villa La Torraccia, since 1999 the collection has been gathered and catalogued in the library of the Scuola. Although 30 pieces remained at the Florence Conservatory, it can be said that the fund has preserved its entirety and contains the composer's personal archives and library. The collection contains 44 autographs (many sketches) of Veretti's compositions, 41 printed scores (mainly by Ricordi) of his works, 178 musical scores and manuscripts by other composers (from all periods, but especially from his contemporaries), 184 studio scores (with music ranging from Haydn to Boulez), and almost 300 monographs on musical, theatrical, literary and poetic subjects (from acoustics to harmonic theory). The archival material includes correspondence, tickets, photocopies, minutes of articles by and about Veretti (also added after his death), theater programs, honors, illustrative notes on his compositions, also in foreign languages, personal photos and photos of performances of his works, sketches and sets. The collection can be consulted on the OPAC of the Scuola di Musica di Fiesole, which is part of the Sistema Documentale Integrato dell'Area Fiorentina (SDIAF).

Prints 
Veretti published almost exclusively with Ricordi, with occasional collaborations with Suvini Zerboni. Most of the first editions are in the Biblioteca Nazionale Centrale in Florence, followed by the Accademia di Santa Cecilia in Rome, the conservatories of Milan and Cagliari, and the Fondazione Levi in Venice.

Letters 
Most of the letters that Veretti sent to his publisher Ricordi are in the Archivio Ricordi in Milan, and many others are in the Fondo Veretti of the Scuola di Musica in Fiesole.

Works 
Veretti composed theatrical, vocal-instrumental, and instrumental music. Major compositions include:

Instrumental or vocal-instrumental music 

 Trio for piano, flute and violin (1919)
 Three biblical poems for song and piano (1921)
 Sonata as a Fantasy for cello and piano (1922)
 Toccata for piano (1923)
 Instrumental Duo for violin and piano (1925)
 Sonata in F for cello and piano (1926)
 Partita for piano (1926)
 Six Stornelli (1926)
 Respect and Song
 Madrigal and Ballad: Two songs of Tasso (1928)
 Pascoliana, for voice and piano (1929)
 Sinfonia italiana for orchestra (1929)
 Suite in C, for orchestra (1934–36)
 Epic Symphony, for orchestra (1939)
 Divertimento, for harpsichord and 6 instruments (1939)
 Four Choirs (1939)
 Sinfonia sacra, for male choir and orchestra, on biblical texts (1943–46)
 Bicinia for violin and viola (1975)

Musical theater 

 The flying doctor, farce in three acts on a text by Riccardo Bacchelli (1923)
 Il favorito del Re, comic opera in three acts and four scenes on a text by Arturo Rossato (first representation: Milan, 1932)
 Il galante tiratore, choreographic action by Riccardo Bacchelli (first performance: Rome, 1933)
 Una favola di Andersen, mime-symphonic action on a libretto by the same Veretti (Venice, 1934)
 Il figliuol prodigo, oratorio for soloists, choir and orchestra (1942)
 Burlesca, opera-ballet in one act, in three pictures and two intermezzos (from a novel of the Thousand and One Nights, remake of the Favorito del Re, 1942–45)
 The seven deadly sins, ballet (1956)

Movie music 

 Le scarpe al sole, film of 1935 directed by Marco Elter.
 Regina della Scala, film of 1936 directed by Guido Salvini and Camillo Mastrocinque.
 Lo squadrone bianco, film of 1936 directed by Augusto Genina.
 Orgoglio, film of 1938, directed by Marco Elter.
 La conquista dell'aria, film of 1939 directed by Romolo Marcellini.
 Inferno giallo, 1942 film directed by Géza von Radványi.
 Bengasi, film of 1942 directed by Augusto Genina.
 L'assedio dell'Alcazar, film of 1940 directed by Augusto Genina.
 Cielo sulla palude, film of 1949 directed by Augusto Genina
 L'edera, 1950 film directed by Augusto Genina.
 Maddalena, film of 1954 directed by Augusto Genina.

Discography

Note

Bibliography 
 
 Guido Maggiorino Gatti, Aspetti della situazione musicale in Italia, in «La rassegna musicale», V/1 (gen 1932), pp. 38–47.
 Filippo Brusa, Il favorito del re di Antonio Veretti ed Arturo Rossato, in «Rivista musicale italiana», XXXIX/1-2 (gen-giu 1932), pp. 152–159.
 VERETTI, Antonio (sub voce), in Enciclopedia Italiana, Seconda Appendice: 1938–1948, Roma: Istituto dell'Enciclopedia italiana, 1949.
 Nicola Costarelli, Antonio Veretti, Sonata per violino e pianoforte, in «Rivista musicale italiana», LVI/1 (gen-mar 1954), p. 99.
 Nicola Costarelli, Antonio Veretti, in «La rassegna musicale», XXV/1 (gen-mar 1955), pp. 26–32.
 Massimo Mila, Sette peccati senza penitenza, in Cronache musicali: 1955-1959, Torino, Einaudi, 1959.
 Nicola Costarelli, Antonio Veretti e la sua Prière pour demander une étoile, in «Chigiana», serie 3, 23, 49, 1966, pp. 291–296.
 Giorgio Vigolo, I peccati dodecafonici, in Mille e una sera all'opera e al concerto, Firenze, Sansoni, 1971.
 Veretti, Antonio (sub voce), in  Vol. II, pp. 831–32.
 Veretti, Antonio (sub voce), in Grande enciclopedia di musica classica, Roma, Curcio, 1982.
 Antonio Trudu, Veretti, Antonio, in Dizionario enciclopedico universale della musica e dei musicisti, diretto da Alberto Basso, serie II: Le biografie, vol. 8: Tem-Z, Torino, UTET, 1988, p. 221.

External links 

1900 births
1978 deaths
Italian film score composers
Italian male film score composers